Ripky is an urban-type settlement in Chernihiv Raion, Chernihiv Oblast (province) of northern Ukraine. The village of Hlynenka is subordinated to Ripky. It hosts the administration of Ripky settlement hromada, one of the hromadas of Ukraine. Population:

History
First mentioned in 1607. The population of Ripky actively participated in the national liberation struggle led by Bohdan Khmelnytsky. The town was a Royiska Sotnia (village Royische near Chernihiv) Chernihiv Regiment at the beginning of the 19th century. - Parish center. In 1905-1907 Ripky was the center for the revolutionary actions of the peasants. During the Civil War many of the residents acted as guerrilla groups, which entered the Bogunskiy regiment. In 1943 residents acted  as underground district committees of the party and guerrilla group.

September 26, 1943 Nazi troops were driven out of Ripky by the Red Army.

Since 1958 Ripky has remained an urban-type settlement.

Until 18 July 2020, Ripky was the administrative center of Ripky Raion. The raion was abolished in July 2020 as part of the administrative reform of Ukraine, which reduced the number of raions of Chernihiv Oblast to five. The area of Ripky Raion was merged into Chernihiv Raion.

2022 Russian Invasion 
Clashes have been ongoing in Ripky between the Ukrainian Armed Forces and the invading Russian Armed Forces in the area since 24 February 2022, with multiple Russian convoys destroyed in ongoing clashes.

Geography and Climate

Demographics

Population

Native Language Distribution (2001)

Economy

Culture

Government

Education

References

Gorodnyansky Uyezd
Urban-type settlements in Chernihiv Raion